The 1911 Tour de France was the 9th edition of Tour de France, one of cycling's Grand Tours. The Tour began in Paris on 2 July and Stage 8 occurred on 16 July with a flat stage to Perpignan. The race finished in Paris on 30 July.

Stage 1
2 July 1911 — Paris to Dunkerque,

Stage 2
4 July 1911 — Dunkerque to Longwy,

Stage 3
6 July 1911 — Longwy to Belfort,

Stage 4
8 July 1911 — Belfort to Chamonix,

Stage 5
10 July 1911 — Chamonix to Grenoble,

Stage 6
12 July 1911 — Grenoble to Nice,

Stage 7
14 July 1911 — Nice to Marseille,

Stage 8
16 July 1911 — Marseille to Perpignan,

References

1911 Tour de France
Tour de France stages